Mariano Patricio Puyol Correa (born 3 June 1960) is a Chilean football manager and  former professional footballer who played as a left winger or attacking midfielder for clubs in Chile and Mexico.

Club career
A product of Universidad de Chile youth system, he played for the club in four steps, making 281 and scoring 75 goals in total. In his last step he performed as team captain. Along with the club he won the 1979 Copa Polla Gol.

In Chile, he also played for Deportes Concepción, Ñublense, Unión San Felipe, Deportes La Serena and Rangers de Talca.

In Mexico, he played for Cruz Azul and Tampico Madero, where the coach was the Chilean Carlos Reinoso. In Tampico Madero, he coincided with his compatriot Carlos Soto.

International career
Puyol made an appearance for the Chile national team  in a friendly match versus Brazil in 7 May 1986, scoring a goal.

Coaching career
Following his retirement, Puyol worked for the Universidad de Chile youth system for 13 years between 1997 and 2010. From 2011 to 2013, he was in charge of coaching Chile at under-15 level. In 2013 he also assumed as coach of Chile at under-17 level, being released in April.

In 2014 he had an experience in the Chilean Tercera B by coaching club Gendarmería de Chile.

In 2019 he returned to Universidad de Chile, coaching at under-12 level until July 2021.

Personal life
His father, Pablo, was a footballer who played for Santiago Morning in the 1940s.

Honours

Club
Universidad de Chile
 Copa Polla Gol: 1979

References

External links
 
 Mariano Puyol at PlaymakerStats
 Mariano Puyol at PartidosdeLaRoja 

1960 births
Living people
Footballers from Santiago
Chilean footballers
Chilean expatriate footballers
Chile international footballers
Universidad de Chile footballers
Deportes Concepción (Chile) footballers
Ñublense footballers
Unión San Felipe footballers
Cruz Azul footballers
Tampico Madero F.C. footballers
Deportes La Serena footballers
Rangers de Talca footballers
Chilean Primera División players
Primera B de Chile players
Liga MX players
Chilean expatriate sportspeople in Mexico
Expatriate footballers in Mexico
Association football forwards
Chilean football managers